Spinmaster is an arcade game developed and released by Data East in December, 1993 in North America, in Europe the same year and on February 18, 1994 in Japan. It is the first game Data East developed and released for the SNK Neo-Geo MVS hardware. Its character designs are almost identical to the ones in Data East's Sega Genesis game titled Dashin' Desperadoes; however, the rest of both games are completely different. Also, Spinmaster'''s gameplay, artwork style, animations of some characters and the styles of its weapons were heavily inspired by another arcade game by Data East titled Joe & Mac, according to the Japanese Miracle Adventure arcade flyer.

After Data East became defunct due to its bankruptcy back in 2003, G-Mode bought the intellectual rights to the Neo-Geo game as well as most other Data East games and licenses them globally.

The game was later re-released on the Virtual Console in Japan on August 3, 2010, the PAL region on November 12, 2010 and in North America on November 22, 2010.

 Gameplay 

In this game, Player One controlling Johnny (Green guy) and Player Two controlling Tom (Red guy) will begin at Madrid Airport in Spain (or in the Japanese version, America Airport in the United States). Johnny and Tom will both be armed with yo-yos to hit enemies and treasure chests that contain better weapons like throwing stars, icicle daggers and guided missiles. Other moves they can perform are slide tackles and use special extreme attacks that defeats every minor enemy and seriously damages bosses on screen. In addition, they can spirit charge their normal yo-yo attack by holding down the button until charged; however the spirit charge isn't very effective in comparison to the regular shot.

 Plot 

Many years ago, a large treasure was hidden by a mysterious guy on an uncharted island. The guy of mystery drew the location of the treasure on a map and hid it deep in the forest of the island. Days turned to weeks, weeks turned to years, and years turned to decades. The guy who hid the map disappeared, never to be seen again. During this time, the map became dirty and weathered, eventually tearing into five pieces which were scattered about the corners of the world. One of these pieces wafted its way into the possession of the young treasure seeker name Johnny. Living with his girlfriend Mary and his rugged sidekick name Tom, Johnny dreamed of the day when he would some day find the ancient treasure on the hidden island of the mysterious guy.

Then one day, the greedy, treasure-seeking mad scientist, Dr. De Playne appeared in Johnny's little town. Seizing Johnny's piece of the treasure map and kidnapping Mary, Dr. De Playne set out to find the treasure and buy up all the toys and candy of the world, plunging the children of earth into a bitter darkness of continuous study and well-balanced meals. Johnny and Tom pursued the mad Dr. De Playne with their yo-yos to save Mary and the world.

 Development 

 Release 

 Reception 

In North America, RePlay reported Spinmaster to be the eleventh most-popular arcade game at the time. Play Meter also listed the game to be the fifty-third most-popular arcade game at the time. The title garnered mostly positive reception from critics and reviewers alike since its initial release.

 Retrospective reviews Spinmaster has been met with mostly positive reception from retrospective reviewers in recent years. In 2014, HobbyConsolas'' identified it as one of the twenty best games for the Neo Geo AES.

Notes

References

External links 
 Spinmaster at GameFAQs
 Spinmaster at Giant Bomb
 Spinmaster at Killer List of Videogames
 Spinmaster at MobyGames

1993 video games
ACA Neo Geo games
Arcade video games
D4 Enterprise games
Data East video games
Data East arcade games
Multiplayer and single-player video games
Neo Geo games
Nintendo Switch games
PlayStation Network games
PlayStation 4 games
Side-scrolling platform games
SNK games
Virtual Console games
Windows games
Xbox One games
Zeebo games
Video games developed in Japan
Hamster Corporation games